Marian Louisa, Lady Elmhirst (previously Ferguson; née Montagu Douglas Scott; 16 June 1908 – 11 December 1996) was the first daughter born to Lord Herbert Montagu Douglas Scott and Marie Edwards. She was the paternal grandmother of Sarah, Duchess of York, and the maternal great-grandmother of Princesses Beatrice and Eugenie of York.

Elmhirst was also a first cousin of Lady Alice Montagu Douglas Scott, who became the Duchess of Gloucester after her wedding to Prince Henry, and an aunt-by-marriage of Queen Elizabeth II. The Countess Spencer, Cynthia, paternal grandmother of Lady Diana, Princess of Wales, was her 2nd cousin.

Early life
Montagu Douglas Scott was born on Tuesday 16 June 1908, the second child and first daughter for Lord Herbert Montagu Douglas Scott, son of William Montagu Douglas Scott, 6th Duke of Buccleuch and Lady Louisa Hamilton, and Marie Josephine Edwards, daughter of James Andrew Edwards and Kate Marion Agnes MacNamara.

Marriage and family
On 1 November 1927, at the age of 19, Marian married Colonel Andrew Ferguson (10 October 1899 – 4 August 1966), in London, England.  The couple had two children:

 John Ferguson (21 January 1929 – 1939)
 Ronald Ferguson (10 October 1931 – 16 March 2003)

Her first son, John, was ten years old when he died from peritonitis. In 2019, Marian's granddaughter Sarah, Duchess of York, revealed in a speech that her uncle had died as a result of an allergic reaction after he ate a crab sandwich.

Her second son, Ronald, was the father of Sarah, Duchess of York, and the maternal grandfather of Princesses Beatrice and Eugenie of York. Ronald Ferguson died on 16 March 2003 from a heart attack, after a lengthy battle with skin and prostate cancers.

On Wednesday, 30 October 1968, a little more than two years after the death of her husband, Andrew Ferguson (4 August 1966), Marian married Sir Thomas Elmhirst, widower of the late Katherine Black, thus becoming Lady Elmhirst. Sir Thomas died on 6 November 1982.

Death
Lady Elmhirst died on Wednesday, 11 December 1996, at Dummer, Hampshire, in her 88th year. She was predeceased by two husbands, Andrew Ferguson (4 August 1966) and Sir Thomas Elmhirst (6 November 1982), and her first-born son John Ferguson (d. 1939).  At the time of her death, she was survived by her son, Major Ronald Ferguson, five grandchildren, and five great-grandchildren.

References

Marian
1908 births
1996 deaths
Wives of knights
People from Dummer, Hampshire